Martial Yao Kouassi (born 4 October 1989) is an Ivorian professional footballer who plays as a midfielder.

Club career
Born in Bingerville, Yao has played for ASEC Mimosas, Stade Tunisien, LPS Tozeur, US Ben Guerdane, Al-Merrikh, AS Gabès, Al-Adalah, Fujairah and Al-Bukiryah.

On 2 June 2018 he moved from Tunisian club AS Gabès to Saudi club Al-Adalah.

International career 
He played at the 2005 FIFA U-17 World Championship, and was compared to Claude Makélélé for his tireless midfield performances.

References

External links
 Profile 

1989 births
Living people
People from Bingerville
Ivorian footballers
ASEC Mimosas players
Stade Tunisien players
LPS Tozeur players
US Ben Guerdane players
Al-Merrikh SC players
AS Gabès players
Al-Adalah FC players
Fujairah FC players
Al-Bukayriyah FC players
Tunisian Ligue Professionnelle 1 players
Saudi First Division League players
UAE Pro League players
Association football midfielders
Ivorian expatriate footballers
Ivorian expatriate sportspeople in Tunisia
Expatriate footballers in Tunisia
Ivorian expatriate sportspeople in Sudan
Expatriate footballers in Sudan
Ivorian expatriate sportspeople in Saudi Arabia
Expatriate footballers in Saudi Arabia
Expatriate footballers in the United Arab Emirates
Ivorian expatriate sportspeople in the United Arab Emirates
Ivory Coast youth international footballers